San Vicente is Spanish for Saint Vincent.

San Vicente may also refer to:

Places

Argentina 
 San Vicente, Buenos Aires
 San Vicente, Misiones
 San Vicente Partido

Bolivia 
 San Vicente Canton, Bolivia and its seat San Vicente

Chile 
 San Vicente de Tagua Tagua

Colombia 
 San Vicente de Chucurí
 San Vicente del Caguán
 San Vicente, Antioquia

Costa Rica 
 San Vicente, Moravia

Ecuador 
 San Vicente, Ecuador
 San Vicente Canton, Ecuador

El Salvador 
 San Vicente, El Salvador
 San Vicente Department
 San Vicente (volcano)

Mexico 
 San Vicente Coatlán, Oaxaca
 San Vicente Lachixio, Oaxaca
 San Vicente Nuñu, Oaxaca
 Misión San Vicente Ferrer, Baja California
 San Vicente Palapa, Guerrero

Northern Mariana Islands 
 San Vicente, Saipan

Philippines 
 San Vicente, Camarines Norte
 San Vicente, Ilocos Sur
 San Vicente, Palawan
 San Vicente, Northern Samar
 San Vicente, San Jose, Camarines Sur
 San Vicente, Ubay, Bohol
 San Vicente, Tubajon, Dinagat Islands

Spain 
 San Vicente del Raspeig
 San Vicente de Oviedo, church in Oviedo
 San Vicente do Mar

United States 
 San Vicente Creek (San Diego County)
 San Vicente Creek (San Mateo County)
 San Vicente Creek (Santa Cruz County)
 San Vicente Boulevard, Los Angeles, California
 San Vicente Boulevard (Santa Monica), California
 San Vicente Mountain Park, Los Angeles, California

See also 
Saint Vincent (disambiguation)
São Vicente (disambiguation)